Silvestre Francisco Dangond Corrales  (born May 12, 1980 in Urumita) is a Colombian singer. He attributes his talents to his father, the singer William José "El Palomo" Dangond Baquero, who during the mid-1970s recorded 10 singles with Andrés "El Turco" Gil; and his mother, who comes from a musical family and passed down her charismatic nature to him, while also playing a major role in his formal and personal education.

Early career

2002: Debut album

After graduating from high school Dangond stayed full dedicated to his music. He grouped with amateur accordion player Ramón López and after performing in some parties and gigs they recorded their first album in 2002 called Tanto para Tí which included 12 songs; Nada te conmueve composed by Fabian Corrales, Necesito verte by Juan Manuel Perez, No te escondas mas by Felipe Pelaez, Mi encantadora egoista by Alberto Murgas, Quien me mando of his own authorship, Un amor tan grande by Freddy Carrillo, Muñeca de porcelana by Luis Alonso, Que no me roben tu corazón by Antonio Meriño, Lloraras un amor by Jaime Bayona, La flor mas linda by Armando Moscote, El extorcionista by Carlos Ramirez and Tanto para ti by Freddy Carrillo. It was during this time that he met his friend and also vallenato singer Kaleth Morales.

2003–2013: Rise to national prominence

By pure coincidence and through friend in common, manager and promoter Carlos Blum, Dangond officially met accordionist Juancho De la Espriella during a serenata (De la Espriella was grouped with singer Peter Manjarrez). Both of them knew who the other was but had never crossed words. Since that day they became good friends. Blum then convinced them to become a musical duo and arranged their first gig together at the Alfonso López Michelsen Building in a celebration of the Cesar Department foundation.

Lo mejor para los dos (The best for the two of us – Album)
Their musical union created great buzz within the vallenato critics and fans, and shortly they recorded their first album together named titled Lo mejor para los dos (2003) containing 13 tracks; La pinta chevere of Dangond's authorship, Nuestra vida by Jose Hernandez, Detalles y recuerdos by Enrique Carrascal, Mi amor por ella by Omar Geles, Ni en pintura by Dagoberto Osorio, El ring ring by Luis Alonso, Sabroso by Hernando Marin, Dejame quererte by Alejandro Sarmiento, No se, me equivoque by Rafael Manjarrez, La razon de mi vivir by Ivan Calderon, El chinchorrito by Alejo Duran, Me vuelve loquito by Josue Rodriguez and Lo mejor para los dos by Kaleth Morales. Dangond and De la Espriella performed in more than 250 shows throughout 2003, most of them in December with 28 presentations.

Mas unidos que nunca (More united than ever – Album)

Their following album was Mas unidos que nunca, released on June 13, 2004 containing 14 songs which included one unplugged bonus track; Cautico mi canto of Dangond's authorship, El vaiven by Hernando Bustos, A blanco y negro by Omar Geles, La Colegiala of Dangond's authorship, Yo no me como ese cuento by Dagoberto Osorio, Acepto el reto by Luis Egurrola, Pa Barranquilla of Dangond's authorship, Me la juego toda by Kaleth Morales, Baila Vallenato by Leo Duran, La Mentira by Wilfran Castillo, Cuando llego en temple by Armando Romero, Celos y que by Luis Alonso, La mujer de mis sueños by Unknown author and La colegiala unplugged version. With this album Dangond and De la Espriella consolidated as one of the most successful vallenato groups in this genre thanks to the acceptance of their hit song La colegiala.

Ponte a la moda (Put up your style – Album)
In 2005 Dangond and De la Espriella released their third album together titled Ponte a la moda which also became a great success in Colombia and outside Colombia, especially within the Latin American community in the United States. The Album included the songs; Ahi viene ahi va of Dangond's authorship, Pa una mujer bonita by Omar Geles, Dile by Alberto Mercado, El tao tao by Lucho Perez, Mi seguidora y yo by Kaleth Morales, Esa mirada by Enrique Araujo, La pareja del momento by Jeiner Lopez, La misteriosa by Isaac Calvo, Ponte a la moda by Luis Alonso, Silvetre en Carnaval by Various artists, Una vez mas by Luis Egurrola, El enredo by Manuel Julian, Por ser machista of Dangond's authorship and La indiferencia (live unplugged) by Luis Alonso.

Personal life
Dangond is the son of amateur singer William José Dangond Baquero (known as 'El Palomo') and Dellys Corrales Rojas and has one brother, Carlos Ivan. He is married to childhood sweetheart Pieri Avendaño and they have 3 children, Luis Jose, Silvestre Jose and Jose Silvestre .

Discography
 With Román López
 Tanto para Tí (2002)
 With Juancho De la Espriella
 Lo Mejor Para Los Dos (2003)
 Más Unidos Que Nunca (2004)
 Ponte a la Moda (2005)
 La Fama (2006)
 El Original (2008)
 El Cantinero (2010)
 No Me Compares Con Nadie (2011)
 Más Unidos Que Nunca: Beta-16 (2020)
 With Rolando Ochoa
 La 9a Batalla (2013)
 Esto es vida (2018) (shared with Jorge Lucas Dangond, Junior Larios and Franco Arguelles)
 With Álvaro López
 Sigo Invicto (2014) (shared with Jorge Lucas Dangond)
 With Jorge Lucas Dangond
 Sigo Invicto (2014) (shared with Álvaro López)
 Gente Valiente (2017)
 Esto es vida (2018) (shared with Rolando Ochoa, Junior Larios and Franco Arguelles)
 Las Locuras Mías (2020)
 Intruso (2022)

Awards and nominations

Latin Grammy Awards
A Latin Grammy Award is an accolade by the Latin Academy of Recording Arts & Sciences to recognize outstanding achievement in the music industry. Silvestre Dangond has received four nominations.

|-
| 2009 || El Original: La Revolución || Best Cumbia/Vallenato Album || 
|-
| 2011 || Cantinero || Best Cumbia/Vallenato Album || 
|-
| 2012 || No Me Compares Con Nadie || Best Cumbia/Vallenato Album || 
|-
| 2013 || La 9a Batalla || Best Cumbia/Vallenato Album || 
|-
| 2015 || Sigo Invicto || Best Cumbia/Vallenato Album || 
|-
| 2017 || Gente Valiente || Best Cumbia/Vallenato Album || 
|-
| 2018 || Esto Es Vida || Best Cumbia/Vallenato Album || 
|-
| 2018 || Cásate Conmigo (With Nicky Jam)  || Best Tropical Song || 
|-

Grammy Awards
A Grammy Award is an award presented by the Recording Academy to recognize achievements in the music industry.

|-
| 2018 || Gente Valiente || Best Tropical Latin Album || 
|-

Premios Nuestra Tierra
A Premio Nuestra Tierra is an accolade that recognize outstanding achievement in the Colombian music industry. Silvestre Dangond has received seven nominations.

|-
| style="text-align:center;" rowspan="8"|2014 || Himself || Artist of the Year  || 
|-
| La 9a Batalla|| Album of the Year || 
|-
| "Lo Ajeno Se Respeta" || Best Vallenato Performance of the Year  || 
|-
| "La Difunta" || Best Vallenato Performance of the Year || 
|-
| Himself || Best Vallenato Solo Artist or Group || 
|-
| Himself || Best Mainstream Artist  || 
|-
| "Lo Ajeno Se Respeta" || Best Mainstream Song || 
|-
| "Silvestristas" || Best Fan Club ||

References

External links 
 Silvestre Dangond official website
 El Vallenato – Silvestre Dangond
 El Vallenato – Silvestre Dangond y Juancho de la Espriella fueron los grandes triunfadores de los Premios Luna
 El Heraldo: Gente Caribe – Silvestre DANGOND y Juan Mario DE LA ESPRIELLA, Más unidos que nunca
 Silvestristave website

1980 births
Living people
Vallenato musicians
Valledupar
21st-century Colombian male singers
Sony Music Colombia artists
People from La Guajira Department
Latin Grammy Award winners
Sony Music Latin artists
Latin music songwriters